Erve (locally ) is a comune (municipality) in the Province of Lecco in the Italian region Lombardy, located about  northeast of Milan and about  southeast of Lecco.

Erve borders the following municipalities: Brumano, Calolziocorte, Carenno, Lecco, Valsecca and Vercurago.

Demographic evolution

References

External links
 www.comune.erve.lc.it/

Cities and towns in Lombardy